The 2008-09 Gonzaga Bulldogs men's basketball team represented Gonzaga University in the 2008-09 NCAA Division I men's basketball season. The Bulldogs are members of the West Coast Conference, were led by head coach Mark Few, and played their home games at the McCarthey Athletic Center on the Gonzaga campus in Spokane, Washington. The Zags finished the season 28–6, 14–0 in WCC play to claim the regular-season championship. They advanced to the championship game of the 2009 West Coast Conference men's basketball tournament where they won the championship game against Saint Mary's. They received an invitation to the 2009 NCAA Division I men's basketball tournament, earning 4 seed in the South Region. They defeated 13 seed Akron and 12 seed Western Kentucky before losing to the 1 seed and eventual champions North Carolina in the sweet sixteen.

Preseason

Departures

2008 recruiting class

Roster

Schedule

|-
!colspan=12 style=|Regular season

|-

|-

|-

|-

|-

|-

|-

|-

|-

|-

|-

|-
!colspan=12 style=|WCC Tournament

|-
!colspan=12 style=|NCAA tournament

References

Gonzaga
Gonzaga Bulldogs men's basketball seasons
Gonzaga
Gonzaga Bulldogs men's basketball
Gonzaga Bulldogs men's basketball